Rich Ferguson may refer to:

 Rich Ferguson (athlete) (1931–1986), Canadian middle-distance runner
 Rich Ferguson (magician) (born 1970), American magician